Saving Power is the fifth live album from the American worship band of the annual Generation Unleashed conference in Portland, Oregon. The album was released on November 19, 2010 under Maranatha! Music, in partnership with Air1 Radio.

The band is now formally known as BridgeCity, as they released their debut self-titled album in 2013.

Track list

Personnel
Primary band
Jeremy Scott – lead vocals, acoustic guitar, executive producer, producer, pre/post production
Bryan Bettis – lead vocals, piano, vocal production
Kim-Maree Roberts – lead vocals
Robby Palmer – lead vocals
Donna Lasit – lead vocals
Yasuhito Hontani – electric guitar
Jer Leary – electric guitar
Gabe Adams – electric guitar
Matt Bushard – bass
Jay Sudarma – drums, graphic design/art direction
Nate Scott – drums
Additional singers
Josh Cross, Genovieve Belindean, Ruthie Miller, Erica Scott, Stephanie Truong, Karina Jameson, Amy Bettis, Dylan Miller
Additional production
Jenee' Fahndrich – choir director
Katrina Tarter – choir director
Jenny Civis – choir director
Poncho Lowder – executive producer
Brian Lawrence – FOH engineer, music engineer, pre/post production
Chris Chesnutt – FOH engineer
Alex Corson – FOH assistant
David Benton – monitor engineer
Rocky Ortega – monitor engineer
Min Bae – monitor assistant
Takahiro Fujii – music engineer, tracking engineer, pre/post production
Colby Goddard – assistant tracking engineer
Henry Seeley – mixer
Dan Shike – mastering
Joh Ridley – assistant
Nick Priest – assistant
Chris Crary – DVD producer
Frank & Sharon Damazio – lead pastors
Camera men & stage lighting
Nate Scott, Brandon Daniel, Josh Enobakhare, Mark Nashif Caleb Brown, David Bushard, Chris Corrado, Chris Crary, Dylan Miller (camera assistant)
Garrett Syfrett, Matt Rich, Henry Truong, Joe Vogel

Music videos

(These videos can also be found on the special deluxe edition DVD of the release)

Notes
The band is based out of City Bible Church in Portland, Oregon and has been around since 1993 for the annual youth conference: Generation Unleashed.
The song "Our God Reigns" was later given a studio recording version on BridgeCity's debut self-titled album in 2013.
The song "He Lives" was originally on the band's fourth live album entitled Generation Unleashed.
The special deluxe edition of the album comes with a DVD which includes a documentary and a few music videos.
The 2010 Generation Unleashed conference, at which the album was recorded, was entitled Saving Power.

References

External links
Generation Unleashed website
BridgeCity website
City Bible Church website

2010 live albums
Contemporary Christian music albums by American artists